State University of Performing and Visual Arts (SUPVA), is a public university in Rohtak, India. It was established in 2011 by Department of Technical Education, and principal secretary govt of Haryana and IAS Dhanpat Singh and Chief Minister of State Sh. Bhupender Singh Hooda layed the foundation stone, and later GTIS converted into a university on 14 August 2014 through Haryana Act No. 24. The university is a joint campus of four institutions: State Institute of Film and Television, State Institute of Design, State Institute of Fine Arts and State Institute of Urban Planning and Architecture.

History
It was established in 2014 university by the Government of Haryana with the name  State University of Performing and Visual Arts, which was renamed to Pandit Lakhmi Chand State University of Performing and Visual Arts on 15 November 2018 by the cabinet committee of the Haryana state after Haryanvi poet Lakhmi Chand. Chief Ar. Ashwani Sabharwal, Govt. Of Haryana was appointed as the first Vice Chancellor of the University.

University has controversial history and famous for student's revolt against the University  administration. Students have always been raising their voice, Whether it is about the controversial appointment of Mr. Rajbir Singh as the third Vice- Chancellor of the university (Current VC of MD University), or against the recruitment process of academic or administrative staff, allocation of tenders to his favorite, etc. However, mostly unheard, but University has always been a centre of politics, and reflects how unworthy people are appointed due to mere politics and people pleasing, and due to influencing political connection. The soul and motto behind the establishment of this unique University was to deliver education through different minds, from people coming from different states graduated from best institution like IIT, NIFT, NID, SPA, and FTII. However, after his appointment as the Vice Chancellor in 2016, Rajbir Singh played an anchor role in demolishing that very spirit of University. Mostly talented faculty coming from different part of Indian state like Jammu & Kashmir, Odissa, Delhi, UP, Bihar, Maharashtra, Jharkhand and others have left or pushed to leave due to autocratic, rude and abusive administration to fill in family & relatives on those positions, local people who were unemployed from ages are appointed in different position of academics and administration. Majority of these faculty are from the Rohtak district only, majority of them have irrelevant or unjustified degrees. Master courses are introduced but hardly any faculty full fill the criteria to teach master degree students. Academics, and student's career is busted but administration is flourishing. Since the commencement of its first batch in July 2011, University could not produce a single alumni to boast in more than a decade period. Undoubtedly, university got beautiful architecture, but building is not what students need at first place, University is known by its students and by its teachers, and on both parameters university fails to deliver. 

History of controversial, corrupt and ineligible appointments like Rajbir Singh shows that politics and undeserving candidates can turn emerging and promising institutions like SUPVA into a educational catastrophe. On one side, a large number of its academician are fighting for 7th pay commission and university scale, while on another side backdoor entry of VC's known are given the position of Faculty Co-ordinator, Social media and press in-charge, digital media is visible example of bigoted administration. This is not the only university where large number of retired school, ITI principal, Physics tution teacher, PT professor are recruited as Dean and are paid hefty salary. 
Majority of female teachers were abused directly or indirectly, threatened to terminate and finally forced to resign due to harsh and patriarchal behavior of retired administration and sick attitude of Vice Chancellor.

When it's come to students, and Student selection process, it becomes significant to mention that it is weak and diseased selection process, because majority of the students who have enrolled or are enrolling are those who consider education as a trivial event and select a institute where they have to do little to get a graduation degree. But, who are responsible, is a question? University teacher, administration or people like VC who are not eligible but appointed. Consequently, University hardly have  10 name working or earning more than 5 lakh a year. Surprisingly, Ninety two percent of their student since the graduation of their first batch are unemployed, university hardly have 10 genuine names on website with employment details to verify their claims of job placement from each course. 

Isn't surprising and painful? Here those faculty are responsible who were given the position through back doors and most probably neither know anyone in the industry to place graduating students nor able deliver education to student in classroom. However, powerful, corrupt and criminal like Singh will always be there in society, and will keep causing academic catastrophe to full fill their lust of money and more power. However Rajbir Singh is not sole responsible, before to him it were students who were influenced by local political parties for appointing a Punjabi as VC and founded a tradition of agitation and revolt for every trivial matter, student agitated against first VC Ar. Ashwani Shabbarwal. Mr Ashwani who was a honest, and intelligent but a soft  men forced to resign. IAS  V S Kundu, was second VC appointed for some time and he tried to bring changes though he was a string administrator but appointed some ineligible people in administration and academics as well, and later got transferred due to both incident. 

Mr. Rajbir Singh, elder brother to CBI Judge who gave verdict in Baba Ram Rahim Case. Later, Rajbir Singh who is under suspicion in plenty of corruption cases and misuse of power, whether it is for his earlier appointment in University without relevant experience, promoted professor without experience and qualifications for the post of professor, Issue of Doctor degree, appointment as Director at Ministry of HRD, finally appointed as VC SUPVA in 2018. Despite his controversial career, everything was ignored after Baba Ram Rahim Case verdict and he becomes favorite and later appointment as VC SUPVA and VC MDU. Singh's family closeness to current CM have been fruitful so far. However, an CBI vigilance enquiry is going on but his brother presence is enough to explain why he is still moving around. 
Brother in laws, wife's cousin and relatives, Judge brother's wife's illiterate cousins as peons, Dr. Seema, Benul Tomar, Mr Virdi, Chirag, Gianander, and many other people were appointed through back doors but following a procedure and abusing the power of deputation and merging them into university. Having such people in administration, who are morally corrupt, have bigoted attitude towards society, education is an irony for any education institute and tough to foresee any action and any change in the University in near time.

See also
 List of institutions of higher education in Haryana

References

External links
 Official Website

2014 establishments in Haryana
Education in Rohtak
Educational institutions established in 2014
Universities in Haryana
Arts organizations established in 2014
Performing arts in India